The Irish League in season 1891–1892 comprised 10 teams, and Linfield F.C. won the championship.

League standings

Results

References
Northern Ireland - List of final tables (RSSSF)

External links
 Irish Premier League Website
 Irish Football Club Project

1891-92
1891–92 domestic association football leagues
Lea